Robinsons Cyberscape is an office development located in Ortigas Center, Quezon City, Metro Manila, one of the oldest CBDs in the Philippines. Owned by Robinson Land Corporation, the development is composed of two buildings named Robinsons Cyberscape Alpha (Tower One) and Robinsons Cyberscape Beta (Tower Two). Expected to be fully turned over by 2016, these buildings introduce a total of  square meters of additional space in Ortigas CBD.

Design and features
Robinsons Cyberscape is designed by architect Jose Siao Ling and Associates. It has floor plates ranging between 1400 sqms. and 2000 sqms. Total building height of Alpha tower is 93 meters above the ground floor level with basements that are 30 meters below ground floor level. The building is said to be built primarily for business process outsourcing companies.

Robinsons Cyberscape Alpha
Robinsons Cyberscape Alpha is located between Sapphire and Garnet Roads, Ortigas Center, Pasig. The building has 21 office floors with high and low zones, 7 basements, warm shell office spaces, column-free office spaces, high speed elevators, 100% back-up power, VRV air conditioning system, CCTV surveillance and 24/7 security and fire protection systems. 
Built in the year 2013, this 26-story building is located within a short distance from Robinsons Galleria and a few meters away from EDSA and Ortigas Avenue. The tower will house office spaces, a hotel, as well as retail units on the ground floor.

Robinsons Cyberscape Alpha is home to a branch of Emerson Electric.

Robinsons Cyberscape Beta
Robinsons Cyberscape Beta is located between Topaz and Ruby roads, Ortigas Center, Pasig City. The 37-story building with 28 office floors has a typical floor plate of 1,480.66 square meters per floor. It has four basements and seven podium parking floors, VRF System type of aircon system, 100% back-up and emergency power provisions and fire protection and sprinkler system and alarm system provisions.  Acquire BPO has signed on as the anchor tenant occupying the top 5 floors (33rd-37th) in addition to their recruitment centre located on the mezzanine level.

See also
 Robinsons Cybergate

References

Skyscrapers in Ortigas Center
Skyscraper office buildings in Metro Manila